Portishead Town Football Club, formerly Portishead A.F.C., are a football club based in Portishead, North Somerset, England founded in 1912. The club is also home to nearly 900 Junior players aged between 5-16 as part of a merger between other Portishead junior football teams. The club is affiliated to the Somerset County FA.

History
Originally known St. Peter's Portishead until a name change in 1948, the club played in small regional leagues for years until joining the Somerset County League in 1975.  They won the Premier Division title four times in five years between 1993–94 and 1997–98.  After their fourth successive runner-up campaign in the 2004–05 season, Portishead successfully applied for promotion to the Western League.

In Portishead's first season of Western League football they finished in the top half of the table only to better their performance the following season. In 2006–07 Portishead achieved their highest ever finish in the history of the club finishing runners-up to Truro City Although Portishead finished as runners-up they were unable to be promoted to the Western League Premier Division as their ground was not suitable, lacking (at that time) floodlights.

The reserve squad plays in the Somerset County League Division one, while the 'A', 'B', and 'Colts' teams all play in the Weston super Mare and District League.

Honours

Somerset County Football League

Winners (4): 1993–94, 1994–95, 1995–96, 1997–98

Runners-up (4): 2001–02, 2002–03, 2003–04, 2004–05

Somerset Senior Cup

Winners (2): 1996–97, 2007–08

Somerset Hospital Cup

Winners (1): 2009

Weston super Mare and District League Division 1

Winners (1): 2016

Attwell Memorial Shield Cup

Winners (2): 2009, 2015

Portishead Town Ladies 
Having previously had a Ladies team, Portishead Town resurrected the Ladies section in 2011.  The team was to be led by Chip Wright and were elected to join Somerset County Women's League.  After initially struggling, the 2015/2016 season saw the team achieving a league and cup double, beating Staplegrove in the final 2-0. The 2016/17 season followed on from the previous year with a league and cup double once again, this time beating Penn Mill 4-3 in a thrilling final.

With promotion to South West Regional Women's Football League, Portishead Town Ladies won their third successive promotion in 2017/18 from the Eastern Division on goal difference from Royal Wootton Basset Ladies. During this season, the Ladies Reserves team was created, who compete in the Somerset County Women's League, winning Division Two in their first season and currently compete in Division One.

Honours

Somerset County Women's League

Division 1 Winners: 2015-16, 2016-17

Division 1 Runners-up: 2013-14

Division 2 Winners: 2017-18 (reserves)

Somerset County Women's League Cup

Winners: 2015-16, 2016-17

Runners-up: 2014-15

South West Regional Women's Football League

Eastern Division Winners: 2017-18

Portishead Town Youth 
In an effort to modernise the club, increase the membership numbers and preserve the clubs status for future generations the club merged with two local junior clubs, Portishead Junior FC and Gordano Valley Giants to create Portishead Town Youth.  The Junior section offers community football for both boys and girls with teams competing in junior leagues across Bristol and North Somerset and two Under 18 sides offering a pathway into the senior sides.  With nearly 900 junior members, Portishead Town FC is one of the largest junior club's in the South West of England.

Ground

Portishead Town play their home games at Bristol Road, Portishead, Bristol, BS20 6QG.

References

External links
Official site

 Western League

Football clubs in Somerset
Football clubs in England
Western Football League
Association football clubs established in 1912
1912 establishments in England
Portishead, Somerset